Berlin Karl-Bonhoeffer-Nervenklinik is a railway station in the Reinickendorf borough of Berlin, Germany. It is served by the Berlin S-Bahn, the  line of the Berlin U-Bahn and named after the adjacent homonymous psychiatric hospital in Wittenau. The namesake psychiatrist Karl Bonhoeffer (1868–1948) was the father of the resistance fighters Klaus and Dietrich Bonhoeffer. Whereas the hospital and the underground station are located in the locality of Wittenau, the S-Bahn station happens to be in the adjacent Reinickendorf, both localities of the Reinickendorf borough.

Overview

The station opened on 1 October 1893 on the Kremmener Bahn (Kremmen Railway) from Berlin-Schönholz to Kremmen, meant to serve the asylum established in 1880. It originally received the name Dalldorf (Kremmener Bahn), the former name of Wittenau until 1905 and was renamed Wittenau (Kremmener Bahn) on 1 January 1906, with the suffix distinguishing it from the Wittenau (Nordbahn) station on the Nordbahn (Northern Railway). It was connected to the S-Bahn network on 16 March 1927. In 1984 service discontinued and was not resumed until 1995. Anticipating the opening of the new underground station the S-Bahn station was renamed as Berlin Karl-Bonhoeffer-Nervenklinik on 29 May 1994.

Meanwhile, the U-Bahn station Karl-Bonhoeffer-Nervenklinik opened in the course of the northern extension of the U8 line on 29 September 1994.

References

Karl BonhOffer Nervenklinik
U8 (Berlin U-Bahn) stations
Karl BonhOffer Nervenklinik
Railway stations in Germany opened in 1893
Railway stations in Germany opened in 1994